Jean-Pierre Pont (born 9 May 1950) is a French politician of La République En Marche! (LREM) who was elected to the National Assembly on 18 June 2017, representing the department of Pas-de-Calais.

Political career
In parliament, Pont serves on the Committee on Legal Affairs and the Committee on European Affairs. In this capacity, he is the parliament's rapporteur on the public health emergency caused by the COVID-19 pandemic in France.

In addition to his committee assignments, Pont is part of the French-Eritrean Parliamentary Friendship Group, the French-Mauritian Parliamentary Friendship Group and the French-Paraguayan Parliamentary Friendship Group.

See also
 2017 French legislative election

References

1950 births
Living people
Deputies of the 15th National Assembly of the French Fifth Republic
La République En Marche! politicians
Place of birth missing (living people)
Union of Democrats and Independents politicians
Members of Parliament for Pas-de-Calais
Deputies of the 16th National Assembly of the French Fifth Republic